Adehim Niftaliyev (born 7 September 1976) is a retired Azerbaijani football player who represented the Azerbaijani national team and played his entire career, apart from a short spell in Iran with Mes Kerman, in Azerbaijan.

Career statistics

National team statistics

References

1976 births
Living people
Azerbaijani footballers
Association football defenders
Azerbaijan international footballers
FK Genclerbirliyi Sumqayit players